John Tabor Kingston Jr. (January 4, 1860 – August 26, 1898) was a member of the Wisconsin State Senate during the 1891 and 1893 sessions.

Kingston, a native of Necedah, Wisconsin, represented the 11th district as a Democrat. After the conclusion of his political career, he served in the United States Army during the Spanish–American War. Soon after the war, Kingston died of peritonitis or typhoid fever on August 26, 1898, in Coamo, Puerto Rico and was buried there.

References

External links

People from Necedah, Wisconsin
People from Ashland, Wisconsin
Democratic Party Wisconsin state senators
Military personnel from Wisconsin
United States Army soldiers
American military personnel of the Spanish–American War
1860 births
1898 deaths
19th-century American politicians